Momčilo "Mike" Stojanović (26 January 1947 – 18 November 2010) was a professional soccer forward most notably playing in the NASL and for the Canadian national team.

Early life
Mike Stojanović, nicknamed Stole in Serbian and Stollie in English, was born in Lapovo (PR Serbia, FPR Yugoslavia), to parents Vitomir and Ruža.

Club career

Early career 
Stojanović spent time in the Yugoslav First League in 1969 with Radnički Kragujevac where he assisted the club in successfully avoiding relegation to the second tier. For his part, he contributed seven goals throughout the season. He briefly played in the Yugoslav second tier with Jedinstvo Paraćin in 1971 before returning to the Radnicki. He also had stints with Vardar Skopje and Morava Velika Plana. 

The Yugoslavian football structure was affected by the monetary reforms imposed by the country's president Josip Tito in the early 1970s which resulted in a decrease in payouts to footballers. The cutbacks caused Stojanović to seek opportunities outside of Yugoslavia. Before moving to North America, Stojanović was set to join OGC Nice, but there were complications with his documentation upon signing. He also had intentions of playing in West Germany but ultimately landed in Canada.

Serbian White Eagles  
In 1973, he landed in Canada's National Soccer League with Toronto-based club Serbian White Eagles FC. In his debut season with Toronto, he assisted the club in securing a postseason berth where he contributed two goals against Toronto Homer in the opening round. He played in the second round of the playoffs where he recorded a goal against Toronto Hungaria but the Serbs were eliminated from the competition. 

Stojanović returned to the Serbs for his sophomore season where he produced a league record by registering 54 goals in 36 matches which ultimately secured him the top goal scorer award. The feat is still a club and National Soccer League record. His contributions helped the Serbs in clinching the regular season title. He also was featured in the Canadian Open Cup where he contributed a goal against Calgary Springer Kickers which secured the title and a berth in the CONCACAF Champions' Cup.  

In 1975, he finished the season once more as the league's top goal scorer with 42 goals in 36 matches.

Rochester Lancers 
Momčilo was recruited by former Toronto head coach Dragan Popović to join the Rochester Lancers in the American-based North American Soccer League in 1976. It was his time in Rochester when his name became anglicized to Mike by the media. He had a productive debut season with the Lancers where he scored 17 goals and finished with 41 points, marking him the league's fourth-leading scorer. He also assisted Rochester in securing a playoff berth after a three-year absence. He participated in the preliminary round of the playoffs where the upstate New York club was eliminated from the competition by Toronto Metros-Croatia. 

Stojanović's contract was renewed for another season in 1977. In his sophomore season in Rochester, he once more aided the team in securing another playoff berth. For the second consecutive season, he finished as the club's top goal scorer with 14 goals. In the opening round of the postseason, he contributed a goal in a penalty shootout against St. Louis Stars. In the Conference finals, he recorded a goal against the New York Cosmos in the opening match, but the Lancers were eliminated from the competition after losing both matches. Following the conclusion of the season he was named to the league's All-Star Second Team. The club also selected him to the Rochester Lancers Team of the Decade.  

His third season with Rochester was cut short after suffering a leg injury which ruled him out for the majority of the season. Throughout the 1978 season, he would appear in 12 matches and registered 4 goals. For the 1979 season, he transitioned into a midfielder role where he would support striker Branko Šegota with a club record of 13 assists and 4 goals. The 1980 season, marked his final run with the organization where he managed to surpass Carlos Metidieri record as the club's all-time goal scorer with 51 goals. He finished the season as the club's top goal scorer along with Segota with 11 goals.

North American Soccer League 
In 1981, Rochester had their franchise revoked which resulted in San Diego Sockers signing Stojanović to a multi-year deal.

He was fifth-best the following season with 14 goals and 33 total points. His most productive season was in 1981 when he finished third with 23 goals and 52 total points while playing for the San Diego Sockers (1981–1982) and was named the NASL's North American Player of the Year. Stojanović also played for the San Jose Earthquakes (1982) which was his last season in the NASL. Stojanović is 9th on the All-Time NASL Top Scorers list with 83 goals in 179 appearances and 10th on the all-time points list with 211, ahead of fellow NASL players George Best, Pelé and Franz Beckenbauer. He was a 2nd Team NASL All-Star in 1977 and an Honorable Mention All-Star in 1981.

Canada 
In 1983, he returned to Canada to play with the Hamilton Steelers in the newly formed Canadian Professional Soccer League. Stojanović recorded his first goal for the club in the debut match on May 23, 1983, against Edmonton Eagles. Shortly after his first match, he received a lengthy suspension as he missed a practice session, but the suspension was later revoked. The Steelers would reach the championship finals in the playoffs where they were defeated by Edmonton.

In 1992, Stojanović, aged 45, played for United Serbs FC based in Oshawa.

International career 
Stojanović was 33 years old when he won his first cap with Canada's senior team on 15 September 1980 in Vancouver (a 4–0 win over New Zealand), scoring on his debut. He played in all of Canada's games in 1980 and 1981, a total of 15 times, scoring five goals. His final cap came in a 2–2 draw on 21 November 1981 versus Cuba in a 1982 World Cup qualification match in Tegucigalpa.

International goals 
Scores and results list Canada's goal tally first.

Honours
Stojanović was inducted into the Canadian Soccer Association Hall of Fame on 6 June 2009. On 7 August 2009 in a pre-game ceremony, the Serbian White Eagles retired the number 9 which was worn by Stojanović while playing for the club from 1974 to 1975. This is the only number the club has retired.

Death
On 18 November 2010, aged 63, Stojanovic died in Toronto after a battle with stomach cancer. He is interred at the Serbian Orthodox Holy Transfiguration Monastery in Milton.

References

External links
 

1947 births
2010 deaths
People from Lapovo
Canadian expatriate sportspeople in the United States
Canada men's international soccer players
Canadian soccer players
Canadian expatriate soccer players
Expatriate soccer players in Canada
Expatriate soccer players in the United States
Canada Soccer Hall of Fame inductees
Association football forwards
Hartford Hellions players
Naturalized citizens of Canada
North American Soccer League (1968–1984) players
North American Soccer League (1968–1984) indoor players
Canadian National Soccer League players
Canadian Professional Soccer League (original) players
Rochester Lancers (1967–1980) players
Serbian White Eagles FC players
San Diego Sockers (NASL) players
FK Radnički 1923 players
FK Vardar players
Yugoslav footballers
Serbian footballers
Serbian expatriate sportspeople in the United States
Serbian emigrants to Canada
Yugoslav expatriates in the United States
Yugoslav emigrants to Canada
Deaths from stomach cancer
Deaths from cancer in Ontario
Burials at Serbian Orthodox monasteries and churches